Buck Creek is a stream in Jefferson County in the U.S. state of Missouri. It is a tributary of Joachim Creek.

The stream headwaters arise at  just northwest of US Route 67 and it flows northeast roughly parallel to that route for about two miles.

Buck Creek most likely was named for the bucks (male white-tailed deer) in the area.

See also
List of rivers of Missouri

References

Rivers of Jefferson County, Missouri
Rivers of Missouri